Kathalin Czifra (born 29 December 1972) is a Hungarian biathlete. She competed in three events at the 1992 Winter Olympics.

References

1972 births
Living people
Biathletes at the 1992 Winter Olympics
Hungarian female biathletes
Olympic biathletes of Hungary
Place of birth missing (living people)